Saint-Just-en-Bas is a commune in the Loire department in central France.

Populations

See also
Communes of the Loire department

References

Saintjustenbas